James Wesley Darden (June 19, 1922 – April 29, 1994) was an American professional basketball player and coach.

Darden played college basketball at the University of Wyoming and University of Denver. He was a member of the Wyoming Cowboys team that won the 1943 NCAA championship, but did not play in the actual tournament because he was serving in World War II at the time. After his discharge in 1946, Darden joined the Denver Nuggets, which was then part of the Amateur Athletic Union. The team joined the National Basketball League in the 1948–49 season, and Darden averaged 10.3 points per game in his first year of playing professional basketball. The Nuggets became a part of the National Basketball Association in the league's inaugural 1949–50 season, and Darden served as a player-coach for the team. He coached 62 games that season, but only played 26 games before suffering an injury midway through the season. He averaged 8.1 points as a player, and coached the team to an 11–61 record. The Nuggets left the NBA after one season to become a part of the National Professional Basketball League, and Darden coached the team, who were renamed the Refiners, to an 18–16 record while also having to play three games after some players left the team during the season. The Refiners disbanded due to financial constraints in early 1951.

Darden became the coach of the basketball and baseball teams at Colorado School of Mines in 1954, and coached both sports at the university until he retired in 1992 at the age of seventy. CSM's baseball field was renamed Darden Field in his honour. Darden was inducted into the Colorado Sports Hall of Fame in 1989.

NBA career statistics

Regular season

Head coaching record

|-
| style="text-align:left;"|Denver
| style="text-align:left;"|
|62||11||51|||| style="text-align:center;"|6th in Western|||—||—||—||—
| style="text-align:center;"|Missed Playoffs
|- class="sortbottom"
| style="text-align:left;"|Total
| ||62||11||51|||||| —||—||—||—||

References

External links
 Career statistics and player information from Basketball-Reference.com
 NBA career statistics as a coach from Basketball-Reference.com

1922 births
1994 deaths
Amateur Athletic Union men's basketball players
American men's basketball coaches
American men's basketball players
Basketball coaches from Wyoming
Basketball players from Wyoming
Chicago Stags draft picks
Colorado Mines Orediggers baseball coaches
Colorado Mines Orediggers men's basketball coaches
Denver Pioneers men's basketball players
Denver Nuggets (1948–1950) coaches
Denver Nuggets (1948–1950) players
Player-coaches
Sportspeople from Cheyenne, Wyoming
Wyoming Cowboys basketball players
Point guards
American military personnel of World War II